Wainfleet St Mary is a village and civil parish in the East Lindsey district of Lincolnshire, England. The 2001 Census recorded a population of 1,106, reducing to 1,025 at the 2011 census. It includes the hamlet of Wainfleet Bank.

History

The first mention of Wainfleet St Mary as a separate and distinct place from Wainfleet All Saints, is in 1378 when it belonged to the Priory of Stixwould.

The limestone Grade II listed church is dedicated to Saint Mary and dates from the 12th century, being restored in 1875 and 1892. The western tower dates from the 12th century although it was raised in the 15th century. Inside is a 15th-century font and a black and white marble monument, with broken pediment, to Edward Barkham who died in 1724.  south of the nave is the remains of a 14th-century stone cross, which is both a scheduled monument and Grade II listed.

There is a Grade II listed windmill at Mill Garage built of red brick in the early 19th century. It ceased working in 1947 and has been converted into a house.

Within the garden of Pinfold Lodge, lying at the junction of Vicarage Road and Low Road, is a brick-built octagonal pinfold roofed with slate. It is Grade II listed and thought to date back to approximately 1800.

Wainfleet St Mary C of E Primary School originated in the Bethlehem Hospital School, built in 1831. It was known as Wainfleet St Mary Church School by 1903, and as Wainfleet St Mary C of E School by 1913 and until 1981. The school was closed in 1987.

Population

Geography

References

External links

Villages in Lincolnshire
Civil parishes in Lincolnshire
East Lindsey District